The University of Prešov is the only public university in the Prešov self-governing region of Slovakia. It focuses on the areas of social, natural, and theological sciences, sport, arts, management, and health care. It was established by law in December 1996 by splitting the University of Pavol Jozef Šafárik in Košice into the University of Pavol Jozef Šafárik in Košice and Prešov University in Prešov. It was officially established on 1 January 1997. The outcomes of its active education and research programmes stretch significantly beyond the borders of Eastern Slovakia. Among its organizational units are three centres of excellence:

 Centre of Excellence in Lingual-Cultural Translation and Interpretation
 Centre of Excellence in Socio-Historical and Cultural-Historical Research
 Centre of Excellence in Animal and Human Ecology

Through bilateral agreements, the university cooperates with 75 higher education institutions from more than 20 countries, while Presov students and teachers can spend time at one of more than 300 universities across Europe under the framework of the Erasmus programme. In addition, staff members present the results of their studies in articles that are published at home and abroad, as well as at various scientific events in countries such as Russia, South Africa, Singapore, Switzerland and the UK.

Faculties

 Faculty of Arts (established in 1959)
 Faculty of Greek-Catholic Theology (established in 1990)
 Faculty of Humanities and Natural Sciences (established in 1997)
 Faculty of Management (established in 2004)
 Faculty of Education (established in 1949)
 Faculty of Orthodox Theology (established in 1950)
 Faculty of Sports (established in 2004)
 Faculty of Health Care (established in 2002)

Journal
On behalf of the University of Prešov, De Gruyter publishes the European Journal of Ecology, an English-language, biannual journal that publishes original, peer-reviewed papers.

References

 Information about the University of Prešov in English

External links

 Official website of University of Prešov

 
Prešov
Educational institutions established in 1997
1997 establishments in Slovakia
Buildings and structures in Prešov